Aston Barret Jr. (born 20 October 1990) is a Jamaican multi-instrumentalist and producer. He is the drummer and leader of the band The Wailers since 2016.

He is the son of Aston “Familyman” Barrett, who was the bassist and musical director for Bob Marley & The Wailers,  nephew of drummer Carlton “Carly” Barrett and grandson of the late Joe Higgs.  In 2017, he received a Grammy award as co-producer with Damian Marley for the track "The Struggle Discontinues", featured on the Album "Stony Hill", which won the Grammy Award for Best Reggae Album. 

In 2018, he joined efforts with the Italian reggae artist Alborosie to co-produce and record the album “Unbreakable – Alborosie meets The Wailers”.

In 2020, he produced and co-wrote the new album of The Wailers One World,  with producer Emilio Estefan, which was released by Sony Music and received a Grammy Nomination for Best Reggae Album of the Year.

Early years 
Born in Kingston, Jamaica, he grew up in a mixed cultured family which was part Rastafari and part Christian.

He first became aware of his family’s fame while watching television at the age of 4, when he saw The Wailers performing their 1979 concert in Santa Barbara. Later, he grew up seeing pictures of Bob Marley and hearing his music, and soon realized his significance in reggae music and popularity.

Aston started playing the bass at a very young age, following in the footsteps of his father, Aston ‘Familyman’ Barrett, and trying to emulate his style.  His father quickly started teaching him how to play this instrument; beginning a mentor-student relationship that would continue for years.   

When he was seven years he joined his first band, meanwhile his father continued to mentor him until Aston moved to the United States, after finishing 5th grade.

Living with his sister in Miami, he joined his school’s jazz band, and started to play drums in order to improve his repertoire of skills.

Musical career 
He gained his first professional experience while he was still in high school, playing bass for Julian Marley and The Uprising Band. Then, he joined them on their first shows around Florida and the rest of America, and eventually toured with them internationally. The group shared the stage with artists such as Stephen Marley, and Nas. Months later, Lauryn Hill sought him out to become her bassist, and the two collaborated for over two years.

Trajectory with The Wailers 
In 2009 he began accompanying his father on tours with The Wailers, when he would occasionally join the band on stage. In 2016, with the urging of his father, he stepped up to become the leader of the band.

"One World" Album 
In 2020 he produced and co-written alongside Emilion Estefan and Josh David Barrett The Wailers´ Album “One World”. 

The album was released by Sony Music Latin and received a Grammy Nomination for Best Reggae Album of the Year. It features guest artists such as Julian Marley, Natiruts, Emily Estefan, Kush Gad, Jesse Royal, and  Carlinhos Brown.

The first single of the album, ‘One World, One Prayer’ had dropped earlier in the year, on 21 May 2020, and featured Farruko, Shaggy, Cedella Marley, and her son, Skip Marley (fresh from chart-topping hits with Katy Perry and H.E.R.)

Other projects and recognitions 
Apart from his role in The Wailers. Aston can also be heard playing guitar, drums, bass, and organ for other artists such as Daniel Marley, Junior Reed, Julian Marley, Kwame Bediaco, Aka Beka, Jessee Royale and Reggae Force. He´s also a co-owner of BAD Lions Productions, who operates a studio in Pompano Beach, Florida.

In 2017, he received a Grammy Award as co-producer with Damian Marley for the track The Struggle Discontinues, featured on the Album "Stony Hill" (Grammy Awarded for Best Reggae Album)

In 2018, he joined with renowned Italian reggae artist Alborosie to co-produce and record the album “Unbreakable – Alborosie meets The Wailers”.

In 2020 he played bass and drums for Romain Virgo’s ‘Best of Me’, produced and played multiple instruments for Kayaman, and worked on the new Reggae Force album.

References 

Living people
Musicians from Kingston, Jamaica
1990 births